Highway 291 (AR 291, Ark. 291, and Hwy. 291) is a north–south state highway in Grant County, Arkansas. The highway connects minor population centers in western Grant County. Established in 1963, the state highway designation was extended to Traskwood from 1965 to 1995, when it was truncated at Tull, forming the current alignment. The highway is maintained by the Arkansas Department of Transportation (ArDOT).

Route description
ArDOT maintains AR 291 as part of the state highway system. ArDOT estimates the traffic level for a segment of roadway was highest at the brief overlap with US 270, estimated at 4,600 vehicles per day in 2020, on average. Traffic drops significantly on either side of Prattsville, estimated at 1,000 VPD north of town and below 500 VPD south of it. For reference, roads under 400 VPD are classified as "very low volume local road" by the American Association of State Highway and Transportation Officials (AASHTO).

No segment of AR 291 is part of the National Highway System (NHS), a network of roads important to the nation's economy, defense, and mobility.

Highway 291 serves western Grant County, which is within the Piney Woods ecoregion, known for flat, rolling plains and oak-hickory-pine forest.

The route begins at a junction with Highway 46 at the unincorporated community of Dogwood near Jenkins' Ferry State Park and runs north through a sparsely populated, forested area. The highway intersects Highway 190 and turns left to continue north to the small town of Prattsville. In Prattsville, Highway 291 has a brief concurrency with US 270. The highway continues north, becoming more rural as it travels, before entering the small town of Tull. The Highway 291 designation ends at Oak Street, with the roadway becoming Highway 190 and continuing toward Benton.

History

The Arkansas State Highway Commission created Highway 291 on April 24, 1963 as part of a large addition of mileage from each county to the state highway system. The designation was created from Highway 46 to the north side of Prattsville. The highway was extended to Highway 229 at Traskwood, including a bridge over the Saline River, on October 27, 1965. On August 30, 1995, the designation between Tull and Traskwood was deleted in exchange for an extension of Highway 229 at the request of the Saline and Grant County judges.

Major intersections

See also
 List of bridges documented by the Historic American Engineering Record in Arkansas, includes a historic bridge over the Saline River between Tull and Traskwood

References

External links
 Tull Bridge along former Highway 291

291
Transportation in Grant County, Arkansas